Crossiura is a genus of skipper butterflies in the family Hesperiidae. They are found in India.

Species
 Crossiura pennicillatum (de Nicéville, 1892)

References

Hesperiidae
Hesperiidae genera
Butterflies of Indochina